Roffe Bath is a historical monument located in the center of Yalta, Crimea, part of the ensemble "France" built by the famous architect Nikolay Krasnov, designer of the Greater Livadia Palace, by the order of merchant Alexey I. Roffe, the owner of the guild "Rofe (Roffe) and Sons" with the pool added in front of the portal in Moorish style.

Famous personalities as Ivan Bunin, Fyodor Shalyapin, Anton Chekhov and other members of the Society of Writers and scholars stayed at the Roffe Bath.

External links
Yalta Real Estate of Sofia Rotaru (in Russian)

Buildings and structures in Yalta
Monuments and memorials in Ukraine
Cultural heritage monuments of regional significance in Crimea